Nusrat Badr (died 24 January 2020) was a lyricist, of 817 songs in 108 films working mostly on Bollywood movies as songwriter. He was nominated for Filmfare Award for Best Lyricist in 2002 for the song "Dola Re Dola" from the movie Devdas. He was the son of Indian poet Bashir Badr.

Discography
Films:
Devdas
Deewar

 Saawariya

Chanda Ki Doli

Dewangee

Familywala

Impatient Vivek

Alag
Ada
Unlimited Nasha

Jahan Jaaeyega Hamen Paaeyega

Rehguzar
Others:

 Khwahishein
 Saanwari
 Jhilmil Sama
 Aye Jahan Aasmaa

Awards and nominations
Nominated for Filmfare Award for Best Lyricist in 2002 for "Dola Re" from Devdas.

References

External links
 

Hindi screenwriters
Hindi-language lyricists
Place of death missing
Place of birth missing
2020 deaths
Year of birth missing
Indian lyricists
21st-century Indian musicians
21st-century Indian poets